Kokiri is a settlement with a railway station on the Arnold River in the west of New Zealand's South Island.

Location 
Kokiri lies on the Greymouth-Christchurch railway line, fourteen miles from Greymouth, and thirty-seven miles from Otira. The settlement is on the western bank of the Arnold river, in the Maori Creek riding of the Grey County.

History 
Kokiri became at the beginning of the 20th century one of the principal seats of the sawmilling industry, and many thousands of feet of timber and white pine sleepers were sent annually to Greymouth for export. The Kokiri Tramway and the sawmills of Baxter Brothers (William James Butler and Joseph Butler) and of Messrs Stratford, Blair, and Company gave employment to a considerable number of men.

In 1906 there was a railway flag station at the township, a post and telephone office, a State school and an hotel. A few small farms in the vicinity are held by some of the workers at the sawmills. At Maori Gully, close by, there were several good goldmining claims. The bush around the township consisted chiefly of silver pine, white pine and red pine, and beech, commonly called birch. There was game in the neighbourhood, and fishing in the river. At the census of 1901 the population was 103.

References

See also
 Kokiri Tramway

Populated places in the West Coast, New Zealand
Grey District
Greymouth